Thabiso Kutumela (born 1 July 1993) is a South African soccer player who currently plays for Mamelodi Sundowns and the South Africa national team. He represented South Africa in the soccer competition at the 2016 Summer Olympics.

International career

International goals
Scores and results list South Africa's goal tally first.

Honours

Baroka F.C.
National First Division - 2015–16 National First Division

Mamelodi Sundowns F.C.
South African Premier Division - 20/21
Nedbank Cup - 2021–22 Nedbank Cup
MTN 8 - 2021 MTN 8

References

External links
 
 

South African soccer players
1994 births
Living people
Footballers at the 2016 Summer Olympics
Olympic soccer players of South Africa
Association football forwards
Baroka F.C. players
Orlando Pirates F.C. players
Maritzburg United F.C. players
Mamelodi Sundowns F.C. players
South African Premier Division players
South Africa international soccer players